Cervera de Pisuerga is a municipality located in the province of Palencia, Castile and León, Spain. 
According to the 2004 census (INE), the municipality had a population of 2,679 inhabitants.

Gallery

References

External links
Town Hall
Web Centre for the Development of Tourism Activities Cervera de Pisuerga

Municipalities in the Province of Palencia